Anosibe Ifanja is a town and commune in Madagascar. It belongs to the district of Miarinarivo, which is a part of Itasy Region. The population of the commune was estimated to be approximately 17,000 in 2001 commune census.

Primary and junior level secondary education are available in town. The majority 95% of the population of the commune are farmers.  The most important crop is rice, while other important products are maize and cassava. Services provide employment for 5% of the population.

Personalities
Rayan Raveloson - Madagascar Soccer National Team

References and notes 

Populated places in Itasy Region